Balmorhea may refer to:

 Balmorhea, Texas, a town in the US
 Balmorhea Lake, near Balmorhea, Texas
 Balmorhea State Park, near Balmorhea, Texas
 Balmorhea (band), from Austin, Texas
 Balmorhea (album), 2007